Veterinary Immunology and Immunopathology is a peer-reviewed medical journal covering allergy and immunology in the domain of veterinary medicine.

External links 
 

Veterinary medicine journals
Immunology journals
Elsevier academic journals
Biweekly journals
English-language journals
Publications established in 1979